Trudy Lynne Harrison (born 19 April 1976) is a British Conservative Party politician who has been the Member of Parliament (MP) for Copeland since the February 2017 by-election. It was the first time Copeland had elected a Conservative MP since 1931, and the first time the constituency had elected a female MP. Three months after her by-election victory, Harrison was re-elected in the 2017 general election and held her seat in 2019.

In December 2019, Harrison was appointed Parliamentary Private Secretary to Prime Minister Boris Johnson. In September 2021, she was appointed Parliamentary Under-Secretary of State at the Department for Transport; she was promoted to Minister of State in the same department in July 2022.

She was appointed Parliamentary Under-Secretary of State for Environment by Prime Minister Liz Truss in September 2022. She was reappointed by Rishi Sunak.

Early life
Harrison was born and brought up in Seascale, England. She was educated at Wyndham School, Egremont. After leaving school, Harrison worked for five years as a technical clerk at Sellafield, before running a childcare business for five years. After taking a four-year career break, two shorter stints of employment followed at Copeland Borough Council, where she worked as a Locality Officer and Community Regeneration Officer. During this time, she completed a Foundation Degree in Sustainable Communities at the University of Salford.

Prior to standing for Parliament, Harrison had been working on 'Bootle2020' and 'The Wellbank Project' – a linked set of projects for bringing new development to Bootle. The Wellbank Project included several phases of proposed property development, with the first phase consisting of eighteen new residential units, which were due to have been built by summer 2018.

Political career
Harrison served as an independent parish councillor in Bootle, Cumbria from 2004 to 2007. Following the resignation of Jamie Reed, the incumbent Labour Party MP for Copeland, Harrison was selected by the Conservative Party to contest the subsequent by-election- having only joined the party one year earlier. The by-election was fought by both the Conservatives and Labour over a number of local issues. Harrison campaigned on a strongly pro-nuclear stance in contrast to Jeremy Corbyn, the leader of the Labour Party. She promised to safeguard thousands of jobs in the constituency by supporting the existing Sellafield site and the possible future Moorside Nuclear Power Station. She also campaigned on a pro-Brexit line and said that Labour wanted "to ignore how we voted in the referendum."

Harrison won the by-election with a majority of 2,147. Her election was seen by many commentators to be historic and a blow to Jeremy Corbyn's leadership of Labour. Her victory in the historically solid Labour constituency was the first by-election gain by a governing party since the 1982 Mitcham and Morden by-election and was also the best by-election performance by a governing party in terms of the increase in its share of the vote since January 1966.

Harrison made her maiden speech on 25 April 2017, shortly before the General Election, at which she was re-elected. It was well received by The Times newspaper. In her first year in office she was subject to some criticism locally for not holding Constituency Surgeries and for being difficult to contact, as well as limited submissions of written parliamentary questions. She defended her record by pointing to fears over the safety of politicians, following the murder of Jo Cox.

On 6 March 2018, Harrison introduced a Ten Minute Rule Motion that seeks to introduce a ban on wild animals in circuses. This was introduced to the Commons as a Private Members Bill, where Harrison stated "Making wild animals travel in crates and perform unnatural tasks for our amusement does not have my support and nor does it have the support of the public."

Harrison previously served as Parliamentary Private Secretary to the Ministry of Defence ministerial team. Harrison served on the Education Committee and was later the Private Parliamentary Secretary to the Secretary of State for Education.

Harrison has questioned the current efficacy of family courts, arguing that they often disadvantage sufferers of domestic abuse.

In July 2019, Harrison supported Michael Gove in the 2019 Conservative Party leadership election.

In October 2019, Harrison voted for Boris Johnson's Brexit deal.

Harrison supports the construction of the UK's first deep coal mine to be built in Copeland.

Harrison stood for, and won, re-election in Copeland at the 2019 general election. Following this she was made Parliamentary Private Secretary to the Prime Minister.

In December 2019, Harrison was appointed Parliamentary Private Secretary to the Prime Minister Boris Johnson, serving alongside Alex Burghart. 

On 17 September 2021, Harrison was appointed Parliamentary Under-Secretary of State at the Department for Transport, during the second cabinet reshuffle of the second Johnson ministry.

Harrison was appointed a Minister of State for Transport on 7 July 2022, serving alongside Wendy Morton.

Personal life
Harrison lives in Bootle, Cumbria and London with her husband Keith, who works as a welder for Shepley Engineers Ltd in the local area, and her four daughters.

Notes

References

External links
 Official website 
 Facebook 
 Instagram
 YouTube
 LinkedIn
 

1976 births
Living people
People from Bootle, Cumbria
21st-century British women politicians
Women councillors in England
Female members of the Parliament of the United Kingdom for English constituencies
Alumni of the University of Salford
Cumbria MPs
Conservative Party (UK) MPs for English constituencies
UK MPs 2015–2017
UK MPs 2017–2019
UK MPs 2019–present
People educated at Wyndham School, Egremont
Parliamentary Private Secretaries to the Prime Minister
21st-century English women
21st-century English people
Councillors in Cumbria